Calico Bay is a bay in Carteret County, North Carolina, in the United States.

Calico Bay was named for its colorful bed thanks to abundant deposits of loam.

References

Bodies of water of Carteret County, North Carolina
Bays of North Carolina